Giuseppe Montaperto (born 23 January 2000) is an Italian professional footballer who plays as a winger for  club Viterbese.

Career

Empoli
Born in Palermo, Montaperto started his career in Empoli youth sector. He was loaned to Juventus Youth Sector for the 2017–2018 season. He played four matches in 2017–18 UEFA Youth League.

In 2019, he was promoted to the first team.

Serie C loans
On 8 July 2019, he joined on loan to Serie C club Pianese. Montaperto made his professional debut on 31 August 2019 against Arezzo.

On 22 September 2020, he was loaned to Cavese.

On 1 September 2021, he was loaned again to Teramo.

Cerignola
On 6 September 2022, Montaperto signed with Audace Cerignola in Serie C.

Viterbese
On 3 January 2023, Montaperto moved to Viterbese.

References

External links
 
 

2000 births
Living people
Footballers from Palermo
Italian footballers
Association football wingers
Serie C players
Empoli F.C. players
Juventus F.C. players
U.S. Pianese players
Cavese 1919 players
S.S. Teramo Calcio players
S.S.D. Audace Cerignola players
U.S. Viterbese 1908 players